NGC 4883 is a barred lenticular galaxy located about 315 million light-years away in the constellation Coma Berenices. NGC 4883 was discovered by astronomer Heinrich d'Arrest on April 22, 1865. It is a member of the Coma Cluster.

See also 
 List of NGC objects (4001–5000)
 NGC 4872

References

External links
 

Coma Berenices
Coma Cluster
Barred lenticular galaxies
4883 
44682 
Astronomical objects discovered in 1865